Ronald L. Nyswaner (born October 5, 1956) is an American screenwriter and film director. He has been nominated for numerous awards including an Academy Award, BAFTA Award, and a Primetime Emmy Award.

He is known for his screenplays Smithereens (1982), Philadelphia (1993), The Painted Veil (2006), Freeheld (2015), My Policeman (2022),. He is also known as a writer and producer of the Showtime series Ray Donovan (2013-2015), Homeland (2017-2018), and the upcoming series Fellow Travelers.

Early life and education
Nyswaner was born in Clarksville, Pennsylvania.

Career
Nyswaner wrote his first screenplay for the Susan Seidelman film Smithereens. After two other notable screenplays for Swing Shift and Mrs. Soffel, he gave his directorial debut with The Prince of Pennsylvania in 1988, a film with Keanu Reeves and Fred Ward.

Nyswaner, who is openly gay and an activist for gay rights, has often worked on movies with the subjects homosexuality, homophobia, and AIDS. In 1993, he came to worldwide prominence for his screenplay to the Academy Award-winning movie Philadelphia, directed by Jonathan Demme. It earned him nominations at the Academy Awards, the Golden Globes, and the BAFTAs.

After several years of working for television, he wrote the screenplay for the 2006 film The Painted Veil which is based on the novel by W. Somerset Maugham. He received a nomination for the Independent Spirit Award and won the award of the National Board of Review in 2006.

From 2015 to 2017, he was an executive producer for the Showtime TV series, Homeland.

In 2015, Nyswaner directed a documentary film, She's the Best Thing In It, featuring Mary Louise Wilson, which he coproduced along with Jeffrey Schwarz and Neda Armian.

Filmography

Film 
As a Director

As a Writer

Television

Awards and nominations 
{| class="wikitable"
|-
! Year
! Award
! Category
! Project
! Result
|-
|1989 || Independent Spirit Awards || Best First Feature || rowspan=2|The Prince of Pennsylvania || 
|-
|1988 || Deauville Film Festival || Critics Prize || 
|-
|1993 || Academy Award || Best Original Screenplay || rowspan=4|Philadelphia || 
|-
|1993 || Golden Globe Awards || Best Screenplay || 
|-
|1993 || British Academy Film Award || Best Original Screenplay || 
|-
|1993 || Writers Guild of America Award || Best Original Screenplay || 
|-
|2006 || Independent Spirit Award || Best Screenplay || rowspan=2| The Painted Veil || 
|-
|2006 || National Board of Review || Best Screenplay || 
|-
|2015 || SXSW Film Festival || Grand Jury Documentary Prize || rowspan=2|She's The Best Thing in It ||  
|-
|2015 || Woodstock Film Festival || Audience Award || 
|-
|2014 || Writers Guild of America Award || New Series || Ray Donovan ||  
|-
|2016 || Primetime Emmy Award || Outstanding Drama Series || Homeland ||  
|-
|}

 Bibliography 
In 2004, he published Blue Days, Black Nights: A Memoir'', which chronicles his relationship with alcohol, drugs, and hustlers.

References

External links
 
 Yahoo UK Movies
 Ron Nyswaner at College University

1956 births
Living people
American memoirists
American male screenwriters
American gay writers
LGBT film directors
Gay memoirists
LGBT people from Pennsylvania
American LGBT screenwriters
University of Pittsburgh alumni
People from Greene County, Pennsylvania
Film directors from Pennsylvania
American male non-fiction writers
Screenwriters from Pennsylvania